Atys vixumbilicata is a species of small tropical sea snail, a bubble snail, a marine opisthobranch gastropod mollusk in the family Haminoeidae, the haminoea bubble snails.

Distribution
This marine species occurs off the Andaman Islands.

Description
The length of the shell of this species attains 3.5 mm, its diameter 2 mm.

(Original description) The  ovate shell is narrowly perforate. It has a pale yellowish horn colour. The shell is very finely spirally striate and rather coarsely grooved towards the ends. The apex is closed. The aperture is narrow above but broadening below. The.columella descends obliquely. The peristome is thickened and produced above the vertex.

References

Haminoeidae
Gastropods described in 1908